The Australian cricket team toured India in October 1996 for a one-off Test match.

Squads

Tour match

Only Test

References

External links
 Tour home at ESPN Cricinfo archives

1996 in Australian cricket
1996 in Indian cricket
1996-97
International cricket competitions from 1994–95 to 1997
Indian cricket seasons from 1970–71 to 1999–2000